Manuel Latusa (born January 23, 1984) is an Austrian professional ice hockey winger who is currently playing with EC Red Bull Salzburg of the Austrian Hockey League (EBEL). He first participated as a member of the Austrian National Team at the 2010 IIHF World Championship and has been a mainstay of the team since.

Career statistics

Regular season and playoffs

International

References

External links

1984 births
Austrian ice hockey right wingers
EC KAC players
EC Red Bull Salzburg players
Living people
Vienna Capitals players
Ice hockey people from Vienna
Ice hockey players at the 2014 Winter Olympics
Olympic ice hockey players of Austria